The United States federal Cutter Service Act of 1914 emphasized providing otherwise-unobtainable medical services for men on board American fishing fleets. It authorized the Commandant of the Revenue Cutter Service to "detail for duty on revenue cutters such surgeons and other persons of the Public Health Service as ... necessary." 

As a result of the act, many cutter vessels were fitted out as hospital ships and "relieved from the regular duties as normally performed by cutters" to cruise the fishing banks off the U.S. coastlines as floating hospitals.

1914 in American law
United States federal legislation